Dominique Souchet (born July 9, 1946 in La Rochelle, Charente-Maritime) was a member of the National Assembly of France between 2008 and 2012.  He represented the Vendée department, is a member of the Movement for France and does not align himself with any parliamentary group.

References

1946 births
Living people
People from La Rochelle
Politicians from Nouvelle-Aquitaine
Movement for France politicians
Deputies of the 13th National Assembly of the French Fifth Republic
Movement for France MEPs
MEPs for France 1999–2004